Araiji is an Arabic surname. Notable people with the surname include:

Gebran Araiji (1951–2019), Lebanese politician
Raymond Araiji (born 1965), Lebanese politician, lawyer, and government minister

Arabic-language surnames